Aulacosternus is a genus of beetles belonging to the family Histeridae.

The species of this genus are found in New Zealand.

Species:

Aulacosternus caledoniae 
Aulacosternus zelandicus 
Sternaulax laevis

References

Histeridae